In music theory, pitch spaces model relationships between pitches.  These models typically use distance to model the degree of relatedness, with closely related pitches placed near one another, and less closely related pitches placed farther apart.  Depending on the complexity of the relationships under consideration, the models may be  multidimensional. Models of pitch space are often graphs, groups, lattices, or geometrical figures such as helixes. Pitch spaces distinguish octave-related pitches.  When octave-related pitches are not distinguished, we have instead pitch class spaces, which represent relationships between pitch classes.  (Some of these models are discussed in the entry on modulatory space, though readers should be advised that the term "modulatory space" is not a standard music-theoretical term.)  Chordal spaces model relationships between chords.

Linear and helical pitch space

The simplest pitch space model is the real line.  A fundamental frequency f is mapped to a real number p according to the equation

This creates a linear space in which octaves have size 12, semitones (the distance between adjacent keys on the piano keyboard) have size 1, and middle C is assigned the number 60, as it is in MIDI.  440 Hz is the standard frequency of 'concert A', which is the note 9 semitones above 'middle C'. Distance in this space corresponds to physical distance on keyboard instruments, orthographical distance in Western musical notation, and psychological distance as measured in psychological experiments and conceived by musicians.  The system is flexible enough to include "microtones" not found on standard piano keyboards.  For example, the pitch halfway between C (60) and C# (61) can be labeled 60.5.

One problem with linear pitch space is that it does not model the special relationship between octave-related pitches, or pitches sharing the same pitch class.  This has led theorists such as Moritz Wilhelm Drobisch (1846) and Roger Shepard (1982) to model pitch relations using a helix.  In these models, linear pitch space is wrapped around a cylinder so that all octave-related pitches lie along a single line.  Care must be taken when interpreting these models however, as it is not clear how to interpret "distance" in the three-dimensional space containing the helix; nor is it clear how to interpret points in the three-dimensional space not contained on the helix itself.

Higher-dimensional pitch spaces
Other theorists, such as Leonhard Euler (1739), Hermann von Helmholtz (1863/1885), Arthur von Oettingen (1866), Hugo Riemann (who should not be confused with mathematician Bernhard Riemann), and Christopher Longuet-Higgins (1978) have modeled pitch relationships using two-dimensional (or higher-dimensional) lattices, under the name of Tonnetz.  In these models, one dimension typically corresponds to acoustically-pure perfect fifths  while the other corresponds to major thirds.   (Variations are possible in which one axis corresponds to acoustically pure minor thirds.)  Additional dimensions can be used to represent additional intervals including—most typically—the octave.

All of these models attempt to capture the fact that intervals separated by acoustically pure intervals such as octaves, perfect fifths, and major thirds are thought to be perceptually closely related.  However, proximity in these spaces need not represent physical proximity on musical instruments: by moving one's hands a very short distance on a violin string, one can move arbitrarily far in these multiple-dimensional models.  For this reason, it is hard to assess the psychological relevance of distance as measured by these lattices.

History of pitch space
The idea of pitch space goes back at least as far as the ancient Greek music theorists known as the Harmonists. To quote one of their number, Bacchius, 
"And what is a diagram? A representation of a musical system. And we use a diagram so that, for students of the subject, matters which are hard to grasp with the hearing may appear before their eyes." (Bacchius, in Franklin, Diatonic Music in Ancient Greece.) The Harmonists drew geometrical pictures so that the intervals of various scales could be compared visually; they thereby located the intervals in a pitch space.

Higher-dimensional pitch spaces have also long been investigated.  The use of a lattice was proposed by Euler (1739) to model just intonation using an axis of perfect fifths and another of major thirds.  Similar models were the subject of intense investigation in the nineteenth century, chiefly by theorists such as Oettingen and Riemann (Cohn 1997).  Contemporary theorists such as James Tenney (1983)<ref name="Harmonic Space (CDC-1)">"''" in Wannamaker, Robert, The Music of James Tenney, Volume 1: Contexts and Paradigms (University of Illinois Press, 2021), 81-84.</ref>  and W.A. Mathieu (1997) carry on this tradition.

Moritz Wilhelm Drobisch (1846) was the first to suggest a helix (i.e. the spiral of fifths) to represent octave equivalence and recurrence (Lerdahl, 2001), and hence to give a model of pitch space. Roger Shepard (1982) regularizes Drobish's helix, and extends it to a double helix of two wholetone scales over a circle of fifths which he calls the "melodic map" (Lerdahl, 2001). Michael Tenzer suggests its use for Balinese gamelan music since the octaves are not 2:1 and thus there is even less octave equivalence than in western tonal music (Tenzer, 2000). See also chromatic circle.

 Instrument design 

Since the 19th century there have been many attempts to design isomorphic keyboards based on pitch spaces. The only ones to have caught on so far are several accordion layouts.

See also
Tonnetz
Spiral array model
Diatonic set theory
Emancipation of the dissonance
Unified field
Vowel space
Color space

References

Cohn, Richard. (1997). Neo Riemannian Operations, Parsimonious Trichords, and Their "Tonnetz" representations. Journal of Music Theory, 41.1: 1-66.
Franklin, John Curtis, (2002). Diatonic Music in Ancient Greece: A Reassessment of its Antiquity, Memenosyne, 56.1 (2002), 669-702.
Lerdahl, Fred (2001). Tonal Pitch Space, pp. 42–43. Oxford: Oxford University Press. .
Mathieu, W. A. (1997). Harmonic Experience: Tonal Harmony from Its Natural Origins to Its Modern Expression. Inner Traditions Intl Ltd. .
Tenney, James (1983). John Cage and the Theory of Harmony.Tenzer, Michael (2000). Gamelan Gong Kebyar: The Art of Twentieth-Century Balinese Music. Chicago: University of Chicago Press. .

Further reading
Straus, Joseph. (2004) Introduction to Post Tonal Theory. Prentice Hall. .
Wannamaker, Robert. The Music of James Tenney, Volume 1: Contexts and Paradigms'' (University of Illinois Press, 2021).

External links
Seven limit lattices
Tenney space
Kees space
Über die mathematische Bestimmung der musikalischen Intervalle, von M.W. Drobisch